Hampstead is a 2017 British drama film directed by Joel Hopkins and written by Robert Festinger. It is based on the life of Harry Hallowes who successfully claimed ownership of a half-acre plot of Hampstead Heath. The film stars Diane Keaton, Brendan Gleeson, James Norton, Lesley Manville, Jason Watkins, Hugh Skinner, and Simon Callow. The film was released on 23 June 2017, by Entertainment One Films.

Cast  
 Diane Keaton as Emily Walters	
 Brendan Gleeson as Donald Horner 		
 James Norton as Philip
 Lesley Manville Fiona
 Jason Watkins as James Smythe
 Phil Davis as Fyfe
 Simon Callow as The Judge	
 Alistair Petrie as Steve Crowley	
 Peter Singh as Xavier
 Will Smith as Leon Rowlands
 Rosalind Ayres as Susan
 Brian Protheroe as Rory
 Alex Gaumond as Mark Kasdan
Hugh Skinner as Erik

Production
The story is based upon the real life events surrounding Harry Hallowes who first squatted on the site in 1987 after being evicted from his council flat in Highgate. Hallowes, who died aged 88 in 2016, battled for the legal rights to own the land on which he had built his shelter arguing that he had gained ownership by  adverse possession.

On 20 October 2015 Diane Keaton and Brendan Gleeson joined the cast of the film. On 13 May 2016 Lesley Manville, James Norton, Jason Watkins, and Simon Callow joined the cast of the film. Principal photography began on 22 May 2016.

Release
The film was released on 23 June 2017 by Entertainment One Films.

Reception
On review aggregator Rotten Tomatoes, the film holds an approval rating of 43% based on 60 reviews, with an average rating of 5.01/10. The website's critics consensus reads: "Hampstead plays matchmaker with a pair of talented veterans, but the sum of their efforts isn't enough to overcome a deeply mediocre story." On Metacritic, the film has a weighted average score of 53 out of 100, based on 10 critics, indicating "mixed or average reviews".

References

External links
 
 

2017 films
2017 comedy-drama films
British comedy-drama films
Films scored by Stephen Warbeck
Films set in London
Films about old age
British films based on actual events
Squatting in film
2010s English-language films
2010s British films